Warren Kenneth Lees  (born 19 March 1952) is a New Zealand cricketer and coach. He played 21 Test and 31 ODIs from 1976 to 1983 as a wicket-keeper batsman. He was coach of the Black Caps from 1990 to 1993.

Domestic career
He made his first-class debut for Otago in 1970 and extended his career until 1988. During this period, he played 146 matches and scored 4932 runs at 24.66 and effecting 348 dismissals.  He took 304 catches and 48 stumping. He also took 2 wickets.
In his List A career he made his debut for Otago in 1971 and he played 81 matches, he scored 1071 runs at 18.78 and he took 82 catches and did 10 stumping. In his final season as captain of Otago (1987–88), Otago won both the one-day and first-class competitions that season.

International career
Lees followed Ken Wadsworth into the New Zealand side and soon proved himself a capable wicketkeeper-batsman. In only his third Test, against Pakistan at Karachi in 1976–77, he made 152 at a time New Zealand were in deep trouble and followed with 46 in the second innings to save the match.

He was very unfortunate to be left out of the tour of England in 1978, arguably being a better wicketkeeper and batsman than Jock Edwards, his replacement, which was described by one journalist as the worst wicketkeeper he had ever seen! He returned to England the following year as part the New Zealand side which reached the semi-finals of the World Cup, but the emergence of Ian Smith meant that these opportunities thereafter were limited.

In 1982–83 he took five catches in an innings and eight in the match against Sri Lanka at Wellington, and played his final Tests on the 1983 tour of England.

Coaching career

Otago
After ending his cricketing career he turned to coaching in 1989, he remained there until 1990 before being promoted to national team with which he spent nearly three years.

New Zealand
Lees' first tour in charge was very tough. New Zealand lost all three Tests and three ODIs, against Pakistan by big margins. Traveling did not get any easier, and they managed only one win on the road, against Zimbabwe in Harare. But there was one standout moment as coach for Lees – the 1992 World Cup.

New Zealand reached the semi-final of the tournament, losing to eventual champions Pakistan. He found good players for New Zealand but was not able to find any of great players. Players like Gavin Larsen, Rod Latham and Willie Watson were his find under Martin Crowe as captain of the team.

It was a tour abroad that ended Lees' national coaching role. After the team abandoned their trip to Sri Lanka in November and December 1992, when bomb blasts threatened their safety.

In 2014, after spending years with Black Caps, Lees became an interim coach of a New Zealand women's national cricket team called White Ferns. During that year, his team had participated in the 2017 World Cup against Sri Lanka and won seven wickets at the County Cricket Ground, Derby.

From 2012 until 2017 Warren Lees spent five years as the coach of the Otago Sparks cricket team. He considers the two titles that they won as a highlight in his coaching career.

Honours
In the 1989 Queen's Birthday Honours, Lees was appointed a Member of the Order of the British Empire, for services to cricket.

Personal life
Lees lives in Clyde, Central Otago, with his wife Jude. He spends his days coaching what he calls "country kids", who do not have access to the same resources as their counterparts in big cities.

References

1952 births
Living people
New Zealand One Day International cricketers
New Zealand Test cricketers
New Zealand cricketers
Otago cricketers
Cricketers at the 1979 Cricket World Cup
Cricketers at the 1983 Cricket World Cup
Coaches of the New Zealand national cricket team
New Zealand cricket coaches
Cricketers from Dunedin
New Zealand Members of the Order of the British Empire
South Island cricketers
Wicket-keepers